Kibangou (can also be written as Kibangu) is a district in the Niari Region of south-western Republic of the Congo. The capital lies at Kibangou.

Towns and villages

Districts of the Republic of the Congo